Quote Unquote Records is a donation-based online independent record label, founded and run by Bomb the Music Industry! and The Arrogant Sons of Bitches frontman Jeff Rosenstock.  The label is an example of Rosenstock's DIY ideals.  Many of the label's artists have personal connections, and all of the music released by the label is available as a free download from its website, along with an array of lyrics and photos.  In fact, the label does not sell any material of any kind, and the website's headline bills the label as "The First Ever Donation Based Record Label".

Rosenstock explains the modest success of Quote Unquote Records by stating, "The donations that come in are not huge, but since we don’t spend that much money they pile up."  Most donations are more than the $5 suggestion.  During October 2008, the Quote Unquote Records web site was shut down over alleged copyright infringement in publishing its own songs; however, the site was quickly restored.

Artists 
Antarctigo Vespucci
Archipelago
The Arrogant Sons of Bitches
Barnaby Jones
Binary Heart
Boboso
Bomb the Music Industry!
The Brass
The Brave Little Abacus
Cheap Girls
Cheeky
Chewing On Tinfoil
Chotto Ghetto
Cold Electrics
Good Shade<ref>[http://www.quoteunquoterecords.com/qur096.htm</ Good Shade releases "Lunch" on Quote Unquote Records</ref>
Hard Girls
Jeff Rosenstock
Kudrow
Lee Hartney Sex Drive
Lenin/McCarthy
Let Me Crazy
Laura Stevenson and the Cans
The Livingbrooks
The Matt Kurz One
The Max Levine Ensemble
Mike Huguenor
O Pioneers!!!
Pegasuses-XL
Pteradon
The Riot Before
Roar
Rick Johnson Rock and Roll Machine
Shinobu
The Taxpayers
Very Okay
The Wild
We Versus The Shark

See also
DIY
Pay what you want
List of record labels

References

External links
Official Website

Record labels established in 2006
Netlabels
American independent record labels
Punk record labels
Ska record labels
Online music stores of the United States
2006 establishments in the United States